Ludvig Hoff  (born 16 October 1996) is a Norwegian ice hockey player who is currently playing for the Stavanger Oilers of the GET-ligaen. He was born in Oslo and is the son of former Olympic athlete, Geir Hoff. He previously spent three seasons playing for the North Dakota Fighting Hawks.

Hoff was selected to compete at the 2018 Winter Olympics as a member of the Norway men's national ice hockey team.

Career statistics

Regular season and playoffs

International

References

External links
 

1996 births
Living people
Ice hockey players at the 2018 Winter Olympics
Lincoln Stars players
Norwegian ice hockey left wingers
Olympic ice hockey players of Norway
Norwegian expatriate sportspeople in the United States
Ice hockey people from Oslo
North Dakota Fighting Hawks men's ice hockey players